In Greek mythology, Europa (/jʊəˈroʊpə, jə-/; Ancient Greek: Εὐρώπη Eurṓpē, Attic Greek pronunciation: [eu̯.rɔ̌ː.pɛː]) or Europe is the name of the following figures:

 Europa, one of the 3,000 Oceanids, water-nymph daughters of the Titans Oceanus and his sister-spouse Tethys. In some accounts, her mother was called Parthenope and her sister was Thraike. Europa was the mother of Dodonaeus (Dodon) by Zeus.
Europa, second wife of Phoroneus and mother of Niobe.
 Europa, a Phoenician princess from whom the name of the continent Europe was taken. She was the lover of Zeus.
 Europe, a queen in her country and one of the many consorts of Danaus, king of Libya. She conceived four of the Danaïdes namely: Amymone, Automate, Agave  and Scaea. These women wed and slayed their cousin-husbands, sons of King Aegyptus of Egypt and Argyphia during their wedding night. According to Hippostratus, Europe was the daughter of the river-god Nilus and begotten all the 50 daughters of Danaus. In some accounts, the later married Melia, daughter of his uncle Agenor, king of Tyre.
 Europa, daughter of the giant Tityos. She bore, beside the banks of the Cephisus, a son Euphemus to the god Poseidon.
 Europe, an Athenian maiden who was the daughter of Laodicus. She was sent by her people to Crete. as one of the sacrificial victims of Minotaur.
 Europe, a surname of Demeter.

Notes

References 
 Apollodorus, The Library with an English Translation by Sir James George Frazer, F.B.A., F.R.S. in 2 Volumes, Cambridge, MA, Harvard University Press; London, William Heinemann Ltd. 1921. . Online version at the Perseus Digital Library. Greek text available from the same website.
Apollonius Rhodius, Argonautica translated by Robert Cooper Seaton (1853-1915), R. C. Loeb Classical Library Volume 001. London, William Heinemann Ltd, 1912. Online version at the Topos Text Project.
 Apollonius Rhodius, Argonautica. George W. Mooney. London. Longmans, Green. 1912. Greek text available at the Perseus Digital Library.
 Gaius Julius Hyginus, Fabulae from The Myths of Hyginus translated and edited by Mary Grant. University of Kansas Publications in Humanistic Studies. Online version at the Topos Text Project.
 Hesiod, Theogony from The Homeric Hymns and Homerica with an English Translation by Hugh G. Evelyn-White, Cambridge, MA.,Harvard University Press; London, William Heinemann Ltd. 1914. Online version at the Perseus Digital Library. Greek text available from the same website.
 John Tzetzes, Book of Histories, Book VII-VIII translated by Vasiliki Dogani from the original Greek of T. Kiessling's edition of 1826.  Online version at theoi.com
 Kerényi, Carl, The Gods of the Greeks, Thames and Hudson, London, 1951.
Maurus Servius Honoratus, In Vergilii carmina comentarii. Servii Grammatici qui feruntur in Vergilii carmina commentarii; recensuerunt Georgius Thilo et Hermannus Hagen. Georgius Thilo. Leipzig. B. G. Teubner. 1881. Online version at the Perseus Digital Library.
 Pindar, Odes translated by Diane Arnson Svarlien. 1990. Online version at the Perseus Digital Library.
 Pindar, The Odes of Pindar including the Principal Fragments with an Introduction and an English Translation by Sir John Sandys, Litt.D., FBA. Cambridge, MA., Harvard University Press; London, William Heinemann Ltd. 1937. Greek text available at the Perseus Digital Library.
 Pseudo-Clement, Recognitions from Ante-Nicene Library Volume 8, translated by Smith, Rev. Thomas. T. & T. Clark, Edinburgh. 1867. Online version at theoi.com
 Stephanus of Byzantium, Stephani Byzantii Ethnicorum quae supersunt, edited by August Meineike (1790-1870), published 1849. A few entries from this important ancient handbook of place names have been translated by Brady Kiesling. Online version at the Topos Text Project.
Tzetzes, John, Book of Histories, Book VII-VIII translated by Vasiliki Dogani from the original Greek of T. Kiessling's edition of 1826. Online version at theoi.com

Oceanids
Princesses in Greek mythology
Queens in Greek mythology
Mythology of Argolis
Libya in Greek mythology